Laman or Lamane may refer to:

People
Karl Edvard Laman, Swedish missionary and ethnographer
Laman and Lemuel, figures in the Book of Mormon
Lamane Jegan Joof, the medieval Serer founder of Tukar

Title
Lamane (or Laman), a Seereer title of nobility
States headed by Serer Lamanes

Places
Laman, Azerbaijan (disambiguation)
Laman, Khachmaz, Azerbaijan
Laman, Lerik, Azerbaijan